Cocorăștii Colț is a commune in Prahova County, Muntenia, Romania. It is composed of eight villages: Cheșnoiu, Cocorăștii Colț, Cocorăștii Grind, Colțu de Jos, Ghioldum, Perșunari, Piatra and Satu de Sus. Until 2004, these belonged to Mănești Commune, when they were split off to form a separate commune.

References

Communes in Prahova County
Localities in Muntenia